Maximilian Ferrari (born August 20, 2000) is a Canadian professional soccer player who plays as a midfielder for York United of the Canadian Premier League

Early life
Born in Toronto, Ferrari grew up in Newmarket, Ontario. He is of Italian and German descent. He began playing youth soccer at age three or four with Newmarket SC. Afterwards, he played for Richmond Hill SC and ANB Futbol, before later moving to Aurora Youth SC. He also played hockey in his youth, winning two titles at the International Silver Stick hockey tournament.

College career
In 2019, Ferrari attended Humber College where he played for he men's soccer team, winning the OCAA title. He scored his first goal on September 21, 2019 against the St. Clair Saints. He was named an OCAA West Division First-Team All-Star and was named the Humber College Coaches Pick.

Club career
From 2017 to 2019, Ferrari played with Aurora FC in League1 Ontario. On July 29, 2018, he scored two goals to lead Aurora to a 3-2 victory over North Mississauga SC. In November 2019, he was named to the CPL’s U-21 Showcase Match for Team Ontario.

In February 2020, Ferrari signed his first professional contract with York9 (which became York United the following season) of the Canadian Premier League. He made his debut on August 15, 2020 against Atlético Ottawa, recording an assist. In October 2020, he extended his contract through the end of 2022, with a club option for the 2023 season. In August 2021, he further extended his contract through 2024. In September 2021, he was named the CPL Player of the Week. After scoring three goals and adding four assists in 30 appearances during the 2021 season, he was nominated for the CPL U21 Player of the Year Award, which was ultimately won by Alessandro Hojabrpour. After the season, York United confirmed that they had received interest from various foreign clubs interested in signing Ferrari.

Career statistics

References

External links

2000 births
Living people
Association football midfielders
Canadian soccer players
Soccer people from Ontario
Canadian people of Italian descent
Sportspeople from Newmarket, Ontario
York United FC players
League1 Ontario players
Canadian Premier League players
Humber College alumni
University and college soccer players in Canada
Aurora FC (Canada) players